Barnaba Cagnoli was an Italian friar from Vercelli. Two time provincial of Lombardy from 1305 to 1313 and from 1319 to 1324. On 1313 was named inquisitor, in whose charge jealous defender of the faith with great honor he was shown and fame for the Order. After the finish of the second provinciality, he was appointed as papal legate in Piedmont by John XXII, reducing the princes and marquess from that region to the unit and the peace, therefore before they were separated of the Church and in war among itself. In 1324 he was elected Master general of the Dominican Order, serving until 1332.

Italian Dominicans
Masters of the Order of Preachers
14th-century Italian Christian monks
People from Vercelli